Christopher Colin Curzon (born 22 December 1958) is a retired English cricketer. Curzon was a right-handed batsman who played primarily as a wicketkeeper.

Curzon made his first-class debut for Nottinghamshire against Northamptonshire in the 1978 County Championship. During the same season Curzon also made his one-day debut against Yorkshire. Curzon represented the club in seventeen first-class matches, the last of which came against Yorkshire in 1980. Curzon's last one-day game for Nottinghamshire came against Northamptonshire in the Quarter-Final of the 1980 Benson and Hedges Cup. This was also to be the last one-day game of Curzon's career. At the end of the 1980 season Curzon left Nottinghamshire.

Curzon played a single first-class match for Hampshire in 1981 against the touring Sri Lankans. This was his only appearance for Hampshire.

External links
Christopher Curzon at Cricinfo
Christopher Curzon at CricketArchive
Matches and detailed statistics for Christopher Curzon

1958 births
Living people
Cricketers from Nottingham
People from Lenton, Nottingham
Cricketers from Nottinghamshire
English cricketers
Nottinghamshire cricketers
Hampshire cricketers